The Year of the Woman was a popular label attached to 1992 after the election of a number of female senators in the United States. The term has also been used with respect to the 2018 House elections, in which a record 103 women were elected, 90 of whom were Democrats.

The hotly contested Senate confirmation hearings for Supreme Court nominee Clarence Thomas involving the allegations of Anita Hill raised the question of the dominance of men in the Senate.

In 1991, the Senate included two female members, but neither Nancy Kassebaum of Kansas nor Barbara Mikulski of Maryland served on the Judiciary Committee. Reportedly, Washington State senate member Patty Murray decided to run for election after watching these hearings.

While Murray set out to raise the necessary funds, two other women several hundred miles to the south in California began work on their own Senate campaigns. As a result, on January 3, 1993, for the first time in American history, California became the first state in the nation to be represented in the Senate by two women. In the 1992 elections, Dianne Feinstein, a former Democratic mayor of San Francisco, running for the balance of an uncompleted term, beat her opponent with a margin of nearly two million votes, while Barbara Boxer—a 10-year veteran of the U.S. House of Representatives who had joined six of her Democratic women colleagues in a march on the Senate to urge greater attention to Anita Hill's charges—solidly won a full term.

At a presidential debate at the University of Richmond, President George H. W. Bush was asked when his party might nominate a woman for President.  Bush brought up the media's catchphrase at the end of his response, saying "This is supposed to be the year of the women in the Senate. Let's see how they do. I hope a lot of them lose."

A week after the election, a popular Washington Post photograph illustrated the situation. Standing with exultant Democratic Majority Leader George Mitchell were not only Murray, Feinstein and Boxer but also Carol Moseley Braun of Illinois, the first black woman elected to the Senate. Never before had four women been elected to the Senate in a single election year. (Five, if Mikulski's successful re-election bid that year is counted.) Within months, another woman senator would join them: Kay Bailey Hutchison of Texas, who won a special election in June 1993.

When the newcomers joined incumbents Kassebaum and Mikulski in January 1993, headline-writers described the occurrence as "The Year of the Woman." In response, Senator Mikulski said, "Calling 1992 the Year of the Woman makes it sound like the Year of the Caribou or the Year of the Asparagus. We're not a fad, a fancy, or a year." Mikulski predicted that as more women joined the Senate the novelty of a female senator would fade; as more women joined the Senate in the coming years this predication came true.

See also
 Blair Babe
 Women in the United States Senate

References

External links
Adapted from Senate Website, a product of the US government

Women in the United States
1992 in American politics
1992 United States Senate elections
Third-wave feminism
Feminism in the United States